Girote , is a village and Union council in Khushab District, Punjab, Pakistan and is region 28 out of 51. It is situated on the western Bank of River Jehlum, and  towards south from Khushab. Specifically, it is located at 32°5'6N 72°16'29E.  The village has a branch of MCB Bank, a basic health facility, and a post office.

Education
There are boys higher secondary school and girls high schools in Girote. The village has private educational institutes Dar-E-Arqam, Amin-Memorial, Community Model school, Ali Memorial, Al-Hamza. The literacy rate is below 30%.

References

Union councils of Khushab District
Populated places in Khushab District